The Constitutions of Clarendon were a set of legislative procedures passed by Henry II of England in 1164. The Constitutions were composed of 16 articles and represent an attempt to restrict ecclesiastical privileges and curb the power of the Church courts and the extent of papal authority in England. In the anarchic conditions of Henry II's predecessor, Stephen (reigned 1135–1154), the church had extended its jurisdiction by taking advantage of the weakness of royal authority. The Constitutions were claimed to restore the law as it was observed during the reign of Henry I (1100–1135).

The Constitutions take their name from Clarendon Palace, Wiltshire, the royal hunting lodge at which they were promulgated.

Purposes
The Constitutions' primary goal was to deal with the controversial issue of "criminous clerks", or clergy who had been accused of committing  a serious secular crime but were tried in ecclesiastical courts by "benefit of clergy". Unlike royal courts, these ecclesiastical courts were strictly limited in the punishments to which a convicted felon could be subjected; in particular the spilling of blood was prohibited. An ecclesiastical case of murder often ended with the defendant being defrocked (dismissed from the priesthood). In a royal court, murder was often punished with mutilation or death.

The Constitutions of Clarendon were Henry II's attempts to deal with these problems (and conveniently increase his own power at the same time) by claiming that once the ecclesiastical courts had tried and defrocked clergymen, the Church could no longer protect the individual, and convicted former clergy could be further punished under the jurisdiction of secular courts.

It was formerly supposed that Henry wanted all clerics accused of crimes to be tried in the King's Courts. But this impression, as F. W. Maitland showed, is certainly wrong. A rather complicated arrangement was proposed by which cognizance of the case was first to be taken in the King's Court.

If the culprit proved to be a cleric, the case was to be tried in the ecclesiastical court, but an officer of the King's Court was to be present. The officer, if the accused was found guilty, was to conduct him back to the King's Court after degradation, where he would be dealt with as an ordinary criminal and adequately punished.

The king's contention was that flogging, fines, degradation, and excommunication, beyond which the spiritual courts could not go, were insufficient as punishment. The archbishop urged that, apart from the principle of clerical privilege, to degrade a man first and to hang him afterwards was to punish him twice for the same offence. Once degraded, he lost all his rights, and if he committed another crime, he might then be punished with death like any other felon.

Effect
Thomas Becket, the Archbishop of Canterbury (1162–1170), resisted the Constitutions, especially the clause concerning "criminous clerks". As a result, Henry put Becket up for trial at Northampton.  Becket fled into exile with his family. Bishops were in agreement over the articles until the Pope disapproved and then Becket repudiated his arguments. The controversy resulted, becoming so bitter that  Becket was murdered on 29 December 1170. After this Henry felt compelled to revoke the two controversial clauses, which went against canon law. However, the rest stayed in effect as law of the land.

References

External links

 The Avalon Project at Yale Law School: Constitutions of Clarendon (source text)
 Constitutions of Clarendon Blog: Constitutions of Clarendon
 

Feudalism in England
12th century in law
1164 in England
English laws
Henry II of England
Medieval English court system
Thomas Becket